Cecilia Yeung Lai-yin (born 1931 in Hong Kong) was the Wong Tai Sin District Board member (1983–1989, 1991–1994) and Urban Councillor (1971–1995). She was also the Vice-chairwoman of the Reform Club of Hong Kong, school supervisor and principal of the St. Claire's College.

She was first elected to the Urban Council in 1971 election while she was questioned by the media with her lack of English ability. She continued to serve in the Council until her defeat by the Democratic Party member Wu Chi-wai in the 1995 election.

References

Members of the Urban Council of Hong Kong
Reform Club of Hong Kong politicians
Liberal Party (Hong Kong) politicians
District councillors of Wong Tai Sin District
Hong Kong educators
1931 births
Living people